Edward Chilufya Jr. (born 17 September 1999) is a Zambian professional footballer who plays as a midfielder for Danish Superliga club Midtjylland.

Club career

Djurgårdens IF
A product of the Mpande Academy in Zambia, Chilufya started training with Djurgården in June 2017. He signed his first professional contract with Djurgården on 15 February 2018. Chilufya made his professional debut for Djurgårdens in a 1–0 Svenska Cupen win over BK Häcken on 12 March 2018. Chilufya made his league debut in Allsvenskan in a 1–3 win over IFK Göteborg on 24 May 2018.

Midtjylland
On 30 January 2022, Chilufya signed with Danish Superliga club Midtjylland, penning a deal keeping him in Herning until December 2026.

International career
Chilufya represented the Zambia national under-20 football team at the 2017 Africa U-20 Cup of Nations. He helped Zambia win the tournament, scoring in the final against the Senegal U20s in a 2–0 win on 12 March 2017. Chilufya ended with 4 goals, and was joint top scorer for the tournament. Chilufya also represented the Zambia at the 2017 FIFA U-20 World Cup, and helped his team make it into the quarterfinals of the competition. He also made 3 appearances for the Zambia U20s 2017 COSAFA U-20 Cup.

Chilufya was called up to the senior Zambia national football team for a 2018 FIFA World Cup qualification match against Nigeria on 7 October 2017, but could not make the roster because of paperwork issues. He made his debut in a friendly 2-1 loss to Kenya on 9 October 2020.

Career statistics

Club

Honours
Djurgårdens IF
 Allsvenskan: 2019
 Svenska Cupen: 2017–18

Zambia U20
 Africa U-20 Cup of Nations: 2017

References

External links
 Profile at the FC Midtjylland website
 
 ESPN Profile
 CAF Online Profile
 DIF profile 

1999 births
Living people
People from Kasama District
Zambian footballers
Zambia international footballers
Zambia youth international footballers
Djurgårdens IF Fotboll players
FC Midtjylland players
Allsvenskan players

Association football midfielders
Zambian expatriate footballers
Zambian expatriate sportspeople in Sweden
Expatriate footballers in Sweden
Zambian expatriate sportspeople in Denmark
Expatriate men's footballers in Denmark
2019 Africa U-23 Cup of Nations players
Zambia under-20 international footballers